Roger Courtois (30 May 1912 – 5 May 1972) was a French football player and manager. He played as a striker.

International career
Born in Switzerland to French parents, Courtois represented the France national team at the FIFA World Cup 1934 and 1938.

Career statistics

Club

International

Honours
Sochaux-Montbéliard
 Division 1: 1935, 1938
 Coupe de France: 1937
 Division 2: 1947
 Division 1 top goalscorer: 1936, 1939

Lausanne-Sport
 Swiss Super League: 1944
 Swiss Cup: 1944

References

External links
 

1912 births
1972 deaths
Swiss people of French descent
Swiss emigrants to France
Footballers from Geneva
French footballers
Swiss men's footballers
Association football forwards
France international footballers
1934 FIFA World Cup players
1938 FIFA World Cup players
Ligue 1 players
Ligue 2 players
Urania Genève Sport players
FC Sochaux-Montbéliard players
FC Lausanne-Sport players
AS Troyes-Savinienne players
French football managers
AS Troyes-Savinienne managers
AS Monaco FC managers
Swiss Super League players
French expatriate footballers
French expatriate sportspeople in Switzerland
Expatriate footballers in Switzerland